SBB (first known as Silesian Blues Band, later as Szukaj, Burz, Buduj – Polish for "Search, Break up, Build") is a Polish progressive rock band formed in 1971 in Siemianowice, Upper Silesia. It consisted of multi-instrumentalist and vocalist Józef Skrzek, guitarist Apostolis Anthimos, the drummer Jerzy Piotrowski and sound engineer Grzegorz Maniecki. It was one of the most popular super-groups in Poland and Europe in the 1970s.

The band was among the forerunners of progressive rock and jazz-rock and attracted many influential jazz musicians, who often performed with the band. The trumpeter Andrzej Przybielski and the saxophonist & bass clarinetist Tomasz Szukalski developed a long lasting relation with SBB.

History
	
From 1971 until late 1973, SBB performed as Niemen supporting Czesław Wydrzycki. As group Niemen they performed at the, organized by Joachim-Ernst Berendt Rock & Jazz Now! opening show for the Olympic Games in Munich (next to Charles Mingus, John McLaughlin & Mahavishnu Orchestra and subsequently toured accompanying Jack Bruce. In Munich they recorded two LP's for CBS Records International, which started a long lasting friendship and cooperation with Reinhold Mack. Reinhold's son Julian Mack performed in 2005 on SBB's album New Century. SBB's cooperation with Niemen is presented on 5 albums.

The group regularly toured Czechoslovakia, East and West Germany, Finland, Sweden, Denmark, Hungary, Austria, Switzerland, the Netherlands and Belgium, where in 1978 SBB won the OIRT award - the Gouden Zeezwaluw (Golden Seaswallow). The band split up in 1980, exactly 13 months before the onset of the martial law in Poland. Józef Skrzek, Tomasz Szukalski and the band's technical crew continued as Józef Skrzek - Tomasz Szukalski Duo and Józef Skrzek Formation taking part in the prophetic movie The War of the Worlds: Next Century produced 11 months before the introduction of the martial law in Poland. After the onset of martial law Apostolis Anthimos joined the jazz trompeter Tomasz Stańko and the Greek band of George Dalaras, Jerzy Piotrowski joined or supported various bands, e.g. Kombi, Young Power, Krzak, Martyna Jakubowicz and Stanisław Sojka and Józef Skrzek performed mainly organ music at sacral buildings.

SBB was briefly re-activated in 1991, 1993, 1998 and finally in 2000. After reactivation SBB also briefly toured the United States (1994, drummer Jerzy Piotrowski stayed in the USA) and Russia and in 2006 performed as a highlight at the Baja Prog festival in Mexicali, Mexico (with the drummer Paul Wertico). 
From 2016 Michał Urbaniak started to support the band.

SBB members
 Józef Skrzek – bass guitar, lead singer, piano, keyboards, harmonica, percussion
 Apostolis Anthimos – guitar, bouzouki, drums, percussion, bass, keyboards
 Jerzy Piotrowski (1971-1994, 2014–present) – drums
 Sławomir Piwowar (1979–1980) – guitar, Fender piano, clavinet
 Andrzej Rusek (1993–94) – bass guitar
 Mirosław Muzykant (1998–1999) – drums
 Ireneusz Głyk (2003-2011) – drums
 Paul Wertico (2000–2007) – drums
 Gábor Németh (2007-2011) – drums

Timeline
<div style="float:left;">

Discography

References

External links

 Paul Wertico - The History of SBB 
 Apostolis Anthimos (SBB) - current tour dates

Polish progressive rock groups